Sassacus is a genus of jumping spiders that was first described by George and Elizabeth Peckham in 1895. It is likely named after Sassacus, a Native American chief of the 16th and 17th century.

Species
 it contains twenty-one species, found in North America, South America, Panama, and Costa Rica:
Sassacus alboguttatus (F. O. Pickard-Cambridge, 1901) – Mexico
Sassacus arcuatus Simon, 1901 – Brazil
Sassacus aurantiacus Simon, 1901 – Brazil
Sassacus aztecus Richman, 2008 – Mexico
Sassacus barbipes (Peckham & Peckham, 1888) – Mexico to Costa Rica
Sassacus biaccentuatus Simon, 1901 – Paraguay
Sassacus cyaneus (Hentz, 1846) – USA
Sassacus dissimilis Mello-Leitão, 1941 – Argentina
Sassacus flavicinctus Crane, 1949 – Venezuela
Sassacus glyphochelis Bauab, 1979 – Brazil
Sassacus helenicus (Mello-Leitão, 1943) – Brazil
Sassacus leucomystax (Caporiacco, 1947) – Guyana
Sassacus lirios Richman, 2008 – Mexico to Costa Rica
Sassacus ocellatus Crane, 1949 – Venezuela
Sassacus paiutus (Gertsch, 1934) – USA, Mexico
Sassacus papenhoei Peckham & Peckham, 1895 (type) – North America
Sassacus resplendens Simon, 1901 – Venezuela
Sassacus samalayucae Richman, 2008 – Mexico
Sassacus sexspinosus (Caporiacco, 1955) – Venezuela
Sassacus trochilus Simon, 1901 – Brazil
Sassacus vitis (Cockerell, 1894) – Canada to Panama

References

External links
 Pictures of P. papenhoei

Salticidae genera
Salticidae
Spiders of North America
Spiders of South America